Connecticut's 146th House of Representatives district elects one member of the Connecticut House of Representatives. It encompasses parts of Stamford and has been represented by Democrat David Michel since 2019.

Recent elections

2022

2020

2018

2016

2014

2012

References

146